Lee Creek Bridge may refer to:

 Lee Creek Bridge (Natural Dam, Arkansas), in the community of Natural Dam
 Lee Creek Bridge (Van Buren, Arkansas), listed on the NRHP in Crawford County
Lee's Creek Covered Bridge, near Dover, Kentucky